Gabriel Ramírez Rodríguez (born 21 December 1982) is a Uruguayan footballer who plays as a forward. He is currently a free agent.

Career
Ramírez joined Uruguayan Segunda División side Cerro Largo in 2003 and went on to make sixty-five appearances and scored nine goals in the following four years, he left the club in 2007 but returned two years later with Cerro Largo now playing in the Uruguayan Primera División. His first match back came during a home defeat to Cerrito, which was the first of five appearances during the 2009–10 season for Cerro Largo.

References

External links

1982 births
Living people
People from Melo, Uruguay
Uruguayan footballers
Association football forwards
Uruguayan Segunda División players
Uruguayan Primera División players
Cerro Largo F.C. players